Chemnitzer Umland – Erzgebirgskreis II is an electoral constituency (German: Wahlkreis) represented in the Bundestag. It elects one member via first-past-the-post voting. Under the current constituency numbering system, it is designated as constituency 163. It is located in western Saxony, comprising parts of the Erzgebirgskreis, Mittelsachsen, and Zwickau districts.

Chemnitzer Umland – Erzgebirgskreis II was created for the 2009 federal election. Since 2021, it has been represented by Mike Moncsek of the Alternative for Germany (AfD).

Geography
Chemnitzer Umland – Erzgebirgskreis II is located in western Saxony. As of the 2021 federal election, it comprises the municipalities of Hohndorf, Jahnsdorf, Neukirchen, Oelsnitz, Thalheim, and Zwönitz and the Verwaltungsgemeinschaften of Burkhardtsdorf, Lugau, and Stollberg from Erzgebirgskreis district; the municipalities of Claußnitz, Erlau, Geringswalde, Hartmannsdorf, Königshain-Wiederau, Lichtenau, Lunzenau, Penig, and Wechselburg and the Verwaltungsgemeinschaften of Burgstädt and Rochlitz from Mittelsachsen district; and the municipalities of Callenberg, Gersdorf, Hohenstein-Ernstthal, and Oberlungwitz and the Verwaltungsgemeinschaften of Limbach-Oberfrohna and Rund um den Auersberg from Zwickau district.

History
Chemnitzer Umland – Erzgebirgskreis II was created in 2009 and contained parts of the abolished constituencies of Chemnitzer Land – Stollberg and Döbeln – Mittweida – Meißen II. In the 2009 election, it was constituency 164 in the numbering system. Since 2013, it has been number 163. Its borders have not changed since its creation.

Members
The constituency was first represented by Marco Wanderwitz of the Christian Democratic Union (CDU) since its creation. It was won by Mike Moncsek of the Alternative for Germany (AfD) in 2021.

Election results

2021 election

2017 election

2013 election

2009 election

References

Federal electoral districts in Saxony
2009 establishments in Germany
Constituencies established in 2009
Erzgebirgskreis
Mittelsachsen
Zwickau (district)